Malaysian Standard Time (MST; , WPM) or Malaysian Time (MYT) is the standard time used in Malaysia. It is 8 hours ahead of Coordinated Universal Time (UTC). The local mean time in Kuala Lumpur was originally GMT+06:46:46. Peninsular Malaysia used this local mean time until 1 January 1901, when they changed to Singapore mean time GMT+06:55:25. Between the end of the Second World War and the formation of Malaysia on 16 September 1963, it was known as British Malayan Standard Time, which was GMT+07:30. At 2330 hrs local time of 31 December 1981, people in Peninsular Malaysia adjusted their clocks and watches ahead by 30 minutes to become 00:00 hours local time of 1 January 1982, to match the time in use in East Malaysia, which is UTC+08:00. SGT (Singapore) followed on and uses the same until now.

History

Time in Peninsular Malaysia

Time in East Malaysia 

Prior to 1 January 1901 – locations in British Malaya with an astronomical observatory would adopt the local mean time based on the observatory's geographical position. Penang, Malacca and Singapore all had their own observatories; hence, the three Straits Settlements had their respective local mean time, with minutes of differences amongst the three locations.
1901 – On 1 January 1901, the Singapore Local Mean Time (Singapore Mean Time) was adopted by Straits Settlements and Federated Malay States as the Standard Time. This was introduced because railway, postal and telegraph services were becoming more common, and a single standard time will ease scheduling problems. Singapore was chosen because it was the administrative centre for the SS and the FMS then.
1905 – On 1 June 1905, the mean time of the 105th meridian was adopted by Straits Settlements and Federated Malay States as the new standard time. This decision was made way back in February 1904. The mean time of the 105th meridian is GMT+07:00 (the local mean time over Greenwich Royal Observatory near London). This standard time went into effect when the time ball on Fort Canning, Singapore was completed and became operational on the same day.
1920 – In 1920, a bill was introduced in the Straits Settlements Legislative Council to adopt daylight saving time just like the United Kingdom. The proposed time was 30 min forward of the mean time of the 105th meridian east, i.e. GMT+07:30. The reason for proposing this was to allow more leisure time for the labourers after work. This bill was dropped after the first reading.
1932 – 12 years after the 1920 introduction of the daylight saving time Bill, the same bill was reintroduced to the Legislative Council. One of the original reasons for dropping the 1920 bill was the argument that 30 minutes was too much change. Therefore, in 1932 the proposed shift was reduced by 10 minutes, down to 20 minutes ahead of the mean time of the 105th meridian. This was a compromise, which was perceived to be more acceptable to the overcautious Legislative Council members. After 2 debating sessions, this bill was passed and became Ordinance No. 21 of 1932. The short title was daylight saving time Ordinance, 1932. This was to come into force on the first day of January 1933 and was to be in force during the year 1933.
1933 – 1 January 1933, the daylight saving time Ordinance came into effect on New Year's Day. This ordinance as passed was in effect for the year 1933 only. Daylight saving time was 20 minutes faster than standard time, i.e. GMT+07:20.
1934–1935 – For the years 1934 and 1935, the daylight saving time Ordinance in 1932 was extended throughout both years by gazette notification.
1935 – In 1935, the daylight saving time Ordinance in 1932 was amended by Ordinance No. 5 of 1935—The daylight saving time (Amendment) Ordinance, 1935. The year limit 1933 was removed, turning the ordinance into permanent effect without the need for the Governor to declare any extensions. The time of GMT+07:20 became permanent standard time with this amendment. The Survey Department since 1935 by Annual Report advised readers to adjust their clocks appropriately by 20 minutes for the year 1936.
1936 – The daylight saving time Ordinance became Chapter 170 in the 1936 edition of the Laws of the Straits Settlements.
1941 – In 1941, the daylight saving time Ordinance was amended yet again by Ordinance 33 of 1941. Daylight saving time would henceforth be 30 min ahead of the mean time of the 105th meridian (10 min more than the original DST), i.e. GMT+07:30. This came into effect on 1 September 1941. This was the original daylight saving time proposed in 1920 and was met with much opposition then.
1942 – After the Japanese invasion of Malaya, on 16 February 1942, the Japanese formally occupied British Malaya. British Malayan Time moved ahead by 1 hour 30 minutes to conform with Tokyo Standard Time, which is GMT+09:00.
1945 – 12 September 1945, Japanese formally surrendered in Singapore. British Malayan Time reverted to "pre-invasion" standard: GMT+07:30. The exact dates for the change to and from Tokyo Standard Time have not been ascertained yet. The dates given here are based on educated speculation.

Standardisation of time in Malaysia 
Prime Minister of Malaysia Mahathir Mohamad declared that people in Peninsular Malaysia would adjust their clocks ahead by 30 minutes to match the time in use in East Malaysia (UTC+08:00) on 31 December 1981.

Timekeeper 
On 1 January 1990, the Malaysian Cabinet appointed the National Metrology Laboratory (Sirim) as the official timekeeper of Malaysia. It propagates coordinated universal time plus 8 hours. This timescale is derived from five atomic clocks maintained by Sirim and is always within 0.9 seconds of the legal time.

IANA time zone database
The IANA time zone database contains two zones for Malaysia in the file zone.tab:

References

External links 
 Malaysian Standard Time (Official site)
 Time Zones in Malaysia

 
Malaysia
Time in Southeast Asia